Perfect murder may refer to:

 Perfect murder, a murder that left no clue to trace the perpetrators
 Perfect murder (fiction), the fiction subgenre
 Perfect Murder, Perfect Town, 2000 film documenting the events behind and following the JonBenet Ramsey murder
 A Perfect Murder, 1998 remake of the 1954 film Dial M for Murder
 A Perfect Murder (band), a groove metal band 
 "A Prefect Murder", an episode of the science fiction television series Farscape
 The Perfect Murder (novel), a 1964 novel by H. R. F. Keating
 The Perfect Murder (1988 film), an English-language Indian film based on Keating's novel, produced by Merchant-Ivory
 The Perfect Murder (James novel), by Peter James (2010)
 The Perfect Murder (2019 film), an urban crime drama short film
 "The Perfect Murder" (short story), a 1988 short story written by Jeffrey Archer
 The Perfect Murder (TV series), 2014 American documentary television series